Urška Pribošič (born  26 July 1990) is an Slovenian snowboarder. She competed in the 2022 Winter Olympics, in  Women's big air, Women's halfpipe, and Women's slopestyle.

She competed at the  2021–22 FIS Snowboard World Cup.

References

External links 

 Lipstick Productions presents No Place Like Home - Urska Pribosic | SNOWBOARDER Magazine

1990 births
Slovenian female snowboarders
Living people
Snowboarders at the 2022 Winter Olympics
Olympic snowboarders of Slovenia
21st-century Slovenian women